The Chekhov Monument (Russian: Памятник А. П. Чехову)  in Rostov-on-Don, Russia is a bronze monument erected in 2010 to commemorate the 150th anniversary since birthday of the Russian writer Anton Pavlovich Chekhov. The monument is located at the intersection of Chekhov street and Pushkinskaya Street.

History 
Monuments to Anton Pavlovich Chekhov have been erected in several Russian cities: in Moscow, Taganrog, Yuzhno-Sakhalinsk, Krasnoyarsk, Tomsk and other smaller settlements. The idea of creating a monument to Chekhov in Rostov-on-Don appeared in the spring of 2010. The author of the monument is the famous Rostov sculptor Anatoly Sknarin. He created a sculpture of the writer based on archival photographs. According to Anatoly Sknarin, bronze sculpture has been created in record-breaking deadlines — less than for a month though to an idea it was already executed three years. Employees of a workshop of art moulding Valery Tarasenko have made the present labour feat, working for 18 hours a day to be in time by an anniversary of the writer.

The sculpture of the writer, about 2.5 metres in height and weight about ton, has been established on a metre pedestal from a granite.

The location of the monument was not immediately determined. Several options were considered such as the area near the Maksimov House at the intersection of Stanislavsky and Semashko streets, near the Book House on Budennovsky Prospekt and on Pushkinskaya Street near the Don State Public Library. But the location eventually decided on by the committee was at the intersection of Pushkinskaya and Chekhov streets, where the statue was unveiled on January 28, 2010.  The height of the monument is 2.5 meters.

References

Monuments and memorials in Rostov-on-Don
Statues in Russia
Tourist attractions in Rostov-on-Don
Anton Chekhov